The Moscow Cup was a one-day cycling race that was held annually in Russia between 2005 and 2015. It was part of the UCI Europe Tour in category 1.2, and was known as the Mayor Cup until 2014.

Winners

References

Cycle races in Russia
2005 establishments in Russia
Recurring sporting events established in 2005
2015 disestablishments in Russia
Recurring sporting events disestablished in 2015
UCI Europe Tour races